Kaina Castillo (born January 22, 1996), known simply as, KAINA (stylized in all caps), is an American singer-songwriter. On July 12, 2019, she released her debut album, Next to the Sun. In 2022, she released her second studio album, It Was a Home.

Early life 
Castillo was born and raised in Chicago, Illinois, to a Venezuelan mother and Guatemalan father. She started discovering music at the age of nine, such as Stevie Wonder, Celia Cruz, and Oscar D'León. She also performed with The Happiness Club, a nonprofit that offers diverse youth a space to explore music, dance, and visual arts.

She studied public relations and advertising at DePaul University for two years.

Career

2019–2020: Next to the Sun 
In early 2019, she released the single "Green". The music video gives a glimpse into her life in Chicago, with a visual of a family dinner.

On July 12, 2019, Castillo released her debut album, Next to The Sun, through Sooper Records.

2021–present: It Was a Home 
On August 9, 2021, Castillo did a cover of "Come Back as a Flower" by Stevie Wonder, along with a music video. This cover served as the first single of Castillo's second studio album. A second single was released, "Casita", on November 2, 2021. The third single, "Anybody Can Be In Love", was released with the announcement of her second studio album. Castillo revealed a tour for the second album was in the works, which will occur in North America and Europe. On January 9, 2022, "Apple" was released as the fourth single.

On March 4, 2022, It Was a Home was released through City Slang. The second album includes collaborations with Sen Morimoto, Sleater-Kinney, and Helado Negro. Two days after the release of the album, the single "Golden Mirror" was released. In April 2022, Castillo announced the official American tour dates for the It Was a Home Tour. For the European tour dates, it ended up postponed or cancelled due to unknown reasons. The North American tour have commenced on March 16 and is set to conclude on July 17, 2022.

Discography

Studio albums

Extended plays

Live albums

Singles

Music videos

References 

Living people
1996 births
Hispanic and Latino American women singers
American Latin pop singers
Spanish-language singers of the United States
Women in Latin music
Musicians from Chicago
American women musicians
American women songwriters
21st-century American singers
21st-century American women singers
DePaul University alumni